The Junkers Ju 352 Herkules ("Hercules" in German) was a German World War II transport aircraft that was developed from the Junkers Ju 252.

Design and development
During the late spring of 1942, the Junkers-Dessau project office was instructed by the Reich Air Ministry (RLM) to investigate the possibility of redesigning the structure of the Junkers Ju 252 transport to make maximum use of non-strategic materials, replacing the Junkers Jumo 211F engines of the Ju 252 with Bramo 323R radial engines. The result followed closely the aerodynamic design of the Ju 252 but was an entirely new aircraft. The wing of the Ju 352 was similar in outline to that of the Ju 252 but, mounted further aft on the fuselage, was entirely of wooden construction. The Ju 352 also had a similar Trapoklappe ("Transportklappe", rear loading ramp) to that of the Ju 252. The ramp allowed the loading of vehicles or freight into the cargo hold while holding the fuselage level.

In general, the Ju 352 was considered a major improvement over the original Junkers Ju 52 but noticeably inferior to the Junkers Ju 252. Deliveries of the Ju 352 had only just begun to get into their stride when, during the summer of 1944, the worsening war situation resulted in the decision to abandon further production of transport aircraft. In September the last two Ju 352As rolled off the assembly line, 10 pre-production Ju 352s and 33 production Ju 352s having been manufactured. Several developments of the basic design were proposed before production was halted, these including the Ju 352B with more powerful engines and increased defensive armament.

Operators

Czechoslovakian Air Force (Postwar)
 
Luftwaffe

One Letov-built aircraft was presented to the Soviet Union in 1946.

Specifications (Ju 352A-1)

Notes

See also

References

1940s German military transport aircraft
World War II transport aircraft of Germany
Ju 352
Trimotors
Low-wing aircraft
Aircraft first flown in 1943